Arlington is a Cotswold village in the parish of Bibury, Gloucestershire, England.

History

In 1066 Arlington had two mills and continued to flourish based on the wool trade until the 18th century.

Arlington was the ancestral home of John Custis II, who emigrated to the Colony of Virginia and named his palatial four-story brick mansion (built in 1675) in Northampton County, Virginia "Arlington" after the town.

Landmarks

Arlington Row is a nationally notable architectural conservation area depicted on the inside cover of all United Kingdom passports. The cottages were built in 1380 as a monastic wool store. This was converted into a row of cottages for weavers in the seventeenth century. It has been used as a film and television location, most notably for the films Stardust and Bridget Jones's Diary.

Arlington Manor was built in the 17th century. It has an adjoining 18th century barn.

Religious sites

On the green is a Baptist church built in 1833.

References

External links
 
 

Villages in Gloucestershire
Cotswold District